Rachel Smith (née Schneider, born July 18, 1991) is an American middle and long-distance runner.

Career 

Born and raised in Sanford, Maine, Schneider began running track in junior high, while attending St. Thomas High School in Dover, New Hampshire. She went on to attend Georgetown University in Washington, D.C., where she became a Big East Conference champion, school-record holder, and earning multiple All-American honors.  After completing a graduate degree at Georgetown, she moved to Flagstaff, Arizona, and has continued a  professional running career, being sponsored by Hoka One One and being coached by Mike Smith.

, Rachel has run the United States women's fifth-fastest mile of all-time at 4:20.91 (at Stade Louis II in Monaco), the 11th-fastest American 5,000m of all-time at 14:52.04 (at Irvine, California), and 10th-fastest American 10,000m of all-time at 31:09.79 (at San Juan Capistrano, California).

In 2019, she competed in the women's 5000 metres at the 2019 World Athletics Championships held in Doha, Qatar, where she failed to advance to the final. In 2021, she won the USATF road mile championship.

On June 21, 2021 she finished 3rd in the US Olympic Trials in the women's 5000 meters, and thus qualified to the 2020 Tokyo Olympic Games.

On July 30, 2021, she competed in the Olympic prelim of the women's 5000m and placed 17th overall and failed to advance to the final.

Achievements

Team USA

USA Track and Field National Championships

NCAA
As a student-athlete at Georgetown University, Rachel Schneider earned 9-time NCAA Division I All-American honors, and 14-time Big East Conference track and field championship finalist.

References

External links 
 
 

1991 births
Living people
People from Sanford, Maine
Georgetown Hoyas women's track and field athletes
American female long-distance runners
American female cross country runners
World Athletics Championships athletes for the United States
Athletes (track and field) at the 2020 Summer Olympics
Olympic track and field athletes of the United States
21st-century American women